Peter Kuruvita (born October 1963) is an Australian chef, restaurateur and media personality, known for his rich culturally inspired cooking, highly influenced by his Sri Lankan father and Austrian mother.

Early life
Born in 1963 in Fulham, to a Sri Lankan father and Austrian mother, Kuruvita lived the first four years of his life in England. In 1967 Kuruvita's family decided to move to his father's hometown of Colombo, Sri Lanka. While growing up in Sri Lanka, he was introduced to cooking through his grandmother's preparation of Sri Lankan cuisine. It was this and a strong sense of family that inspired him to pursue food as a career.

In 1974 Kuruvita and his family moved to Sydney, where he went to school. Upon finishing high school he began an apprenticeship as a chef at East Sydney TAFE. He completed his final year at the new Ryde Catering College.

Career
Kuruvita's first job was in the kitchen at a local seafood restaurant in southern Sydney, he remained there until 1981 when he moved to complete his studies and gain experience working with Greg Doyle, at the Rogues restaurant & nightclub, where he worked for the next two years. In 1982, completing his apprenticeship Kuruvita took up a role, at the One Star Michelin restaurant Rue St Jacques in London, as the commis chef. Kuruvita later secured a chef role, at the Three Star Michelin restaurant, Waterside Inn, Bray England

Peter has since worked all over the world at hotels and resorts including the Four Seasons Hotel, Philadelphia USA, Yasawa Island Lodge, Fiji, as well as some of Sydney's top restaurants Barrenjoey House; Bilson's; Hayman Island Resort.

Restaurants
Flying Fish 2003
Peter Kuruvita is Consultant Chef of Flying Fish Restaurant in Pyrmont, New South Wales on Sydney Harbour. The restaurant was opened in 2004. The Flying Fish serves modern Australian dishes with a strong seafood focus.

Flying Fish, Fiji
Peter opened Flying Fish Fiji in partnership with Starwood Hotels in 2008, situated on the sand at the Sheraton Fiji Resort Nadi Fiji

Steak House by Peter Kuruvita
Situated at the Westin Hotel Nadi Fiji.

Noosa Beach House
Peters Latest partnership with Accor hotels, situated in the Sofitel Noosa Resort and Spa.

Television shows
My Sri Lanka with Peter Kuruvita (2011) A 10-part series as Peter Kuruvita returns to his ancestral homeland of Sri Lanka. Beginning in Colombo, Kuruvita travels extensively to many different corners across the country experiencing a range of different tastes and colours.

Island Feast With Peter Kuruvita (2011) A 10-part series.

Mexican Fiesta with Peter Kuruvita (2014) A 10-part series.

Peter Kuruvita's Coastal Kitchen (2016)

Books
 Serendip: My Sri Lankan Journey, 
 Serendip: My Sri Lankan Kitchen,

References

External links
 Peter Kuruvita
 Flying Fish

1963 births
Australian television chefs
Australian restaurateurs
Australian food writers
Living people
Australian people of Sri Lankan descent
Australian people of Austrian descent
British people of Sri Lankan descent
British people of Austrian descent
Sri Lankan television chefs